Maan varjot (Earth's Shadows) is a composition for solo organ and orchestra by the Finnish composer Kaija Saariaho.  The work was jointly commissioned by the Montreal Symphony Orchestra, the Orchestre national de Lyon, Southbank Centre, and the Philharmonia Orchestra.  It was first performed in Montreal on May 29, 2014, by the organist Olivier Latry and the Montreal Symphony Orchestra under the conductor Kent Nagano.

Composition
Maan varjot has a duration of approximately 15 minutes and is composed in three numbered movements.  Saariaho described the work in the score program notes, writing:
The title of the piece comes from Percy Bysshe Shelley's 1821 poem Adonaïs (an elegy to John Keats) and was chosen in memory of the composer's father.

Instrumentation
The work is scored for solo organ and an orchestra comprising piccolo, two flutes (2nd doubling alto flute), two oboes, cor anglais, two clarinets, E-flat clarinet, two bassoons, four horns, two trumpets, three trombones, tuba, timpani, three percussionists, harp, and strings.

Reception
Maan varjot has received a positive response from music critics.  Mark Swed of the Los Angeles Times wrote, "This may not be exactly a return on her part to her organ roots, but the electric energy she brings to the timbre of the organ as well as to the orchestra is a reminder not just of where she came from but also how far she has come."  He added, "The central movement held the most earthly colors, the grays and browns of the metallic elements and of the soil. Lush melody found a voice. But radiance again rose in the final section, a mirage of sound effects."  Hannah Nepil of the Financial Times also lauded the piece, writing, "Maan varjot is a sophisticated example of Saariaho's work; its shimmering textures and gliding harmonies seem to come from a galaxy far beyond our own, evoking a reel of cinematic images.  For large sections, we could be at the bottom of an ocean, in a world of rippling, mysterious shapes and shadows. Then we come up for air to hear what sounds like parts of Messiaen's Turangalîla Symphony put through a blender. Only at this point does the organ let out a real roar, a moment savoured by Latry."  Jim Farber of the San Francisco Classical Voice declared it a "superb example" of Saariaho's music, opining, "At times the organ blends into the orchestral fabric as a rumbling, pulsing, growling presence. Then like a magma pool no longer under restraint, it bursts forth in eruptive crescendos of full-voiced magnitude causing tectonic shifts in the orchestral landscape."

Conversely, Andrew Clements of The Guardian called the work "a curious piece" and remarked, "The three movements flit in and out of focus, and the solo writing seems to reference a century's worth of the organ repertoire from Franck, through Reger, to Messiaen and Langlais. Even the Festival Hall's clinical acoustic couldn't really resolve the shifting sonorities of the opening section, and the ambiguities between the microtonal writing for the orchestra and the well-tempered pitches of the organ don't really register as they should."

References

Compositions by Kaija Saariaho
2013 compositions
Music for orchestra and organ
Music commissioned by the Philharmonia Orchestra